The 2000 Mongolian National Championship was the thirty-third recorded edition of top flight football in Mongolia and the fifth season of the Mongolian Premier League, which took over as the highest level of competition in the country from the previous Mongolian National Championship. Erchim were champions, their first (and to date only) title, Sonor were  runners up, with Bajangol in third place.

References

Mongolia Premier League seasons
Mongolia
Mongolia
football